Stuart Malcolm Leggatt (November 9, 1931 – September 21, 2002) was a Canadian politician and judge.

Born in New Westminster, British Columbia, he received a Bachelor of Arts degree from the University of British Columbia and a law degree in 1954. He practised law in Port Coquitlam and Vancouver. In 1969, he was elected as an alderman in Port Coquitlam. He was elected to the House of Commons of Canada for the riding of New Westminster in the 1972 federal election. A New Democrat, he was re-elected in the 1974 election. From 1979 to 1983, he was the NDP MLA for the Coquitlam-Moody riding.

In 1983, he became a judge. He was appointed to the Supreme Court of British Columbia in 1990.

Archives 
There is a Stuart Leggatt fonds at Library and Archives Canada. Archival reference number is R3293.

References

External links
 

1931 births
2002 deaths
British Columbia New Democratic Party MLAs
Judges in British Columbia
Members of the House of Commons of Canada from British Columbia
New Democratic Party MPs
People from New Westminster
University of British Columbia alumni
Lawyers in British Columbia
Peter A. Allard School of Law alumni